Bukharan Jews in Israel, also known as the Bukharim, refers to immigrants and descendants of the immigrants of the Bukharan Jewish communities, who now reside within the state of Israel.

History
The first Bukharan Jews to make Aliyah arrived in the 1870s and 1880s, establishing the Bukharim quarter in Jerusalem.

1881–1947

In 1890, seven members of the Bukharan Jewish community formed the Hovevei Zion Association of the Jewish communities of Bukhara, Samarkand and Tashkent. By 1914, around 1,500 Bukharan Jews had immigrated, and 4,000 more arrived in the early 1930s. In 1940, publications in Bukhori were shut down by the Soviets along with most Bukharan schools.

1948–1990
In 1948 began the "Black Years of Soviet Jewry," where suppression of the Jewish religion resumed after stopping due to war. In 1950 thirteen religious Bukharan Jews in Samarkand were arrested and sentenced to 25 years. Similar arrests happened to prominent Bukharim in Kattakurgan and Bukhara. The Six-Day War led to a rise in Jewish patriotism among Bukharan Jews and many carried out demonstrations as refuseniks. Until 1972, there was no major immigration of Bukharim to Israel. It was from then until 1975 when 8,000 managed to immigrate from the USSR. By 1987, 32,000 Bukharan Jews lived in Israel, around 40% of the Bukharim. In 1990, there were riots against the Jewish population of Andijan and nearby areas. This led to most Jews in the Fergana Valley immigrating to Israel or the United States.

1990s–present
From 1989 to 2005 over 5,000 Bukharan Jews from Kyrgyzstan came to Israel due to increased hostility in the region. In 1992, there was a secret airlift operation which brought a small number of Bukharan Jews from Tajikistan to Israel. From 1989 to 2000, over 10,000 made aliyah from Tajikistan. Today, most Bukharim live in Israel with a significant population in America. Only 1,000 Jews remain in Tajikistan, 1,500 in Uzbekistan, and only 150 in the city of Bukhara.

See also
 Bukharan Jews
 Aliyah
 Iranian Jews in Israel
 Georgian Jews in Israel
 1970s Soviet Union aliyah
 1990s Post-Soviet aliyah

References

 

Bukharan-Jewish culture in Israel
Bukharan Jews topics
Israeli people of Uzbekistani-Jewish descent
Israeli Jews by region
Israel–Uzbekistan relations